Frank Drabble (8 July 1888 – 29 July 1964) was a professional footballer who played for Bloxwich Wesley, Southport YMCA, Tottenham Hotspur, Nottingham Forest, Burnley, Bradford Park Avenue, Southport Central, Bolton Wanderers and Queens Park Rangers.

Playing career 
Drabble had spells with youth clubs Bloxwich Wesleyans and Southport YMCA before joining Tottenham Hotspur in 1909. The goalkeeper played one match in his time at the club. He played a further eight matches at Nottingham Forest in 1910. Drabble played two matches for Burnley in 1910 before featuring in 32 matches at Bradford Park Avenue. He had further spells at Southport Central (twice), Bolton Wanderers and finally Queens Park Rangers.

Personal life 
After his retirement from football, Drabble worked as an estate agent.

References 

1888 births
1964 deaths
Footballers from Southport
English footballers
Association football goalkeepers
Tottenham Hotspur F.C. players
Nottingham Forest F.C. players
Burnley F.C. players
Bradford (Park Avenue) A.F.C. players
Bolton Wanderers F.C. players
Southport F.C. players
Queens Park Rangers F.C. players
English Football League players
Brentford F.C. wartime guest players